The Choral Synagogue or the Great Synagogue was the main synagogue in Brest, Belarus (known in Yiddish as Brisk). Completed in circa 1862, it was used as a synagogue until World War II.

History 

An old synagogue had stood in Brest for nearly a century, having been built in 1759. However in 1847, its building was either destroyed or had burned down, and funds were collected to erect a new building. The building took years to complete due to a lack of funding; despite the construction's commencement being in 1851, the structure was only completed in 1861/1862. In 1859, a fire ravaged the synagogue but it was restored. In 1941, with the creation of the Brest Ghetto during World War II, the synagogue sat on the ghetto border, next to its entrance, and was used by the Nazis as a warehouse. Although the building was damaged in 1942 during the ghetto's liquidation, it remained standing until 1959. At that time, it was confiscated by the communist government and transformed into a theatre, known today as Cinema Belarus. A plaque outside memorializes the synagogue. In addition, Hebrew inscriptions are still visible in the basement.

Rabbis 

Brest was home to a flourishing Orthodox Jewish community. At the time of the original synagogue's destruction, the city's rabbi was Rabbi Yaakov Meir Padua. In fact, he personally drew up the blueprints for the new synagogue. However, he died in 1855 before the building's completion. He was succeeded by Rabbi Tzvi Hirsch Orenstein, an influential rabbi who opened a communal hospital and an old age home. However he was exiled by the authorities in1874 and succeeded by Rabbi Yehoshua Leib Diskin. Immensely popular, his yeshiva attracted prodigious Torah scholars. Rabbi Diskin was also a fierce opponent of the secular Haskalah (Jewish enlightenment) movement, and when a club of Haskalists (Hebrew: maskilim) arose in Brest under the tutelage of a man named Alexandrov, he worked to disband it. In revenge, Alexandrov libeled him to the police on false claims of theft, leading to him being arrested. While he soon managed to get out of prison, he emigrated to the British Mandate. His post in Brest was filled by his student, Rabbi Yosef Dov Soloveitchik (the Beis HaLevi). The rabbinate would remain in his family for the next two generations, passing on to his son, Rabbi Chaim Soloveitchik, and then to his grandson Rabbi Yitzchak Zev Soloveitchik, who led the community until World War II. The latter was the founder of the famed Brisk Yeshiva in Jerusalem.

Gallery

See also 
Brisk tradition and Soloveitchik dynasty
Great Synagogue (Grodno)

References 

Buildings and structures in Brest, Belarus
History of Brest, Belarus
Synagogues completed in 1862
20th-century synagogues
Synagogues in Belarus
Orthodox synagogues
Former synagogues